Manjak may refer to:

Manjak language, a Bak language spoken by the Manjak people
Manjak people, a ethnic group in Guinea-Bissau and Senegal
Maniago, a town in Italy
Manjak (Vladičin Han), a village in Serbia
Dejan Manjak (fl. 1333), Serbian nobleman

See also
 Manjack (disambiguation)